Javier Velayos Rodríguez (born 6 April 1987) is a Spanish footballer who plays as a right back.

Club career

Early years
Born in Madrid, Velayos arrived in Real Madrid's youth system at the age of ten. In 2006, he helped the Juvenil team win the Champions Cup of the category, appearing in 34 games and playing alongside Alberto Lora.
 
Velayos made his senior debut in the 2006–07 season, playing nine Segunda División matches for Real Madrid Castilla as the reserves were relegated. His first appearance as a professional took place on 14 January 2007, as he came on as a second-half substitute in a 0–1 away loss against UD Almería.

In the summer of 2010, Velayos joined Getafe CF's reserves, competing in Segunda División B and helping the team retain their newly found division status.

Romania
On 28 July 2011, Velayos signed a two-year contract – with an option for a third – with Romanian club FC Brașov. In the 2013 off-season he moved teams but stayed in Liga I, joining CFR Cluj.

References

External links

1987 births
Living people
Footballers from Madrid
Spanish footballers
Association football defenders
Segunda División players
Segunda División B players
Real Madrid C footballers
Real Madrid Castilla footballers
Getafe CF B players
Racing de Ferrol footballers
Liga I players
FC Brașov (1936) players
CFR Cluj players
ASA 2013 Târgu Mureș players
Spanish expatriate footballers
Expatriate footballers in Romania
Spanish expatriate sportspeople in Romania